Julius Gibrilla Wobay (born 19 May 1984) is a Sierra Leonean international footballer who plays as an attacking midfielder.

Football career

East End Lions
Julius Gibrilla Wobay was born and raised in Freetown, Sierra Leone to parents from the Mende ethnic group. He attended the Ahmadiyya Muslim Secondary School in Freetown. He began his professional football career in his native Sierra Leone with East End Lions in the Sierra Leone National Premier League.

Cyprus
After the 2003 season, Wobay left the Sierra Leone National Premier League and signed with Cyprus side Onisilos Sotira where he played 12 matches and scored three goals. Then Wobay signed with Nea Salamis Famagusta FC, a club in Cyprus top division.

Universitatea Craiova
In January 2007, Wobay moved to Romanian Liga I side Universitatea Craiova on a four and a half year contract from Cypriot club Nea Salamina FC for $450k.

Aris Limassol
Three years after his movement from Salamina to Craiova, Wobay comes back (on a loan until the end of the season) to Cyprus but this time for Aris Limassol. On 20/1 he signed his contract with Cypriot side. The deal doesn't include a summer buying option for Aris Limassol.

Khazar Lankaran
After returning to Universitatea Craiova for the first half of the 2010–11 season, Wobay went on to sign a two-year contract with Khazar Lankaran in the Azerbaijan Premier League during the winter break. Wobay went on to make 26 appearances for Khazar, scoring 6 goals.

Al-Masry
On 31 January 2012, Wobay signed for Al-Masry of Egypt on a contract till the end of 2011-12 season, and was in the stands watching his new club as the Port Said Stadium riot unfolded.

Neftchi Baku

During the summer of 2012 Wobay signed a one-year contract with Neftchi Baku. Wobay made his club debut in their 3–0 UEFA Champions League second qualifying round 1st leg match against Zestafoni, scoring the second goal. Wobay followed this up with a goal in the second leg and one in their 6–2 aggregate defeat to Ironi Kiryat Shmona in the third round, which saw them knocked into the UEFA Europa League play off round where Wobay also scored to help Neftchi reach the Group Stage of the UEFA Europa League for the first time. During the 2012–13 season Wobay played in 31 league games, scoring eight goals, and five cup games to help Neftchi win a 2013 League and Cup double.

Wobay has signed a new contract with Neftchi in June 2013, before moving on loan to Al Shabab of the UAE Arabian Gulf League on a year-long loan in July 2013. Wobay was deregistered by Al Shabab during the 2014 January transfer window.

Olimpija
On 29 January 2016 Wobay signed a one-and-a-half-year contract with Slovenian club Olimpija Ljubljana.

International
On 14 February 2001 Wobay made his debut for the Sierra Leone national team in a 2002 FIFA World Cup qualifier against Liberia in a match played in the Liberian capital of Monrovia. He retired from international football in December 2018.

Career statistics

International goals
Scores and results list Sierra Leone's goal tally first.

Honours

Khazar Lankaran
Azerbaijan Cup: 2010–11
Neftchi Baku
Azerbaijan Premier League: 2012–13
Azerbaijan Cup: 2012–13
Olimpija Ljubljana
Slovenian First League: 2015–16

References

External links
 Julius Wobay at PrvaLiga 
 
 
 
 
 

1984 births
Living people
People from Bo, Sierra Leone
Mende people
Association football midfielders
Sierra Leonean footballers
Sierra Leone international footballers
Sierra Leonean expatriate footballers
Nea Salamis Famagusta FC players
FC U Craiova 1948 players
Aris Limassol FC players
Khazar Lankaran FK players
Al Masry SC players
East End Lions F.C. players
Onisilos Sotira players
Al-Shaab CSC players
NK Olimpija Ljubljana (2005) players
Expatriate footballers in Cyprus
Expatriate footballers in Romania
Expatriate footballers in Azerbaijan
Expatriate footballers in Egypt
Expatriate footballers in the United Arab Emirates
Expatriate footballers in Slovenia
Liga I players
Cypriot First Division players
Slovenian PrvaLiga players
Sierra Leonean expatriate sportspeople in Romania
UAE Pro League players
Neftçi PFK players